This article describes the qualification for the 2014 European Men's Handball Championship.

Qualification system

Seeding
The draw for the qualification round was held on the 27 March 2012 at the EHF headquarters, in Vienna, Austria. Denmark as host nation and (defending champion), was directly qualified.
39 teams had registered for participation. 38 teams compete for 15 places at the final tournament in 2 distinct Qualification Phases. In each phase, the teams were divided into several pots according to their positions in the EHF National Team Ranking.

Seeding for Qualification Phase 1

Qualification Phase 1
The games were played in a mini-tournament, hosted by one country. The group winners and the two best second-ranked teams advanced to the second phase.

Group 1
Venue: University of Cyprus Athletic Center, Nicosia

All times are local (UTC+2).

Group 2
Venue: Palaflorio, Bari

All times are local (UTC+2).

Group 3
Venue: Maccabi House Arena, Rishon LeZion

All times are local (UTC+3).

Group 4
Venue: Edip Buran Sport Hall, Mersin

All times are local (UTC+3).

Qualification Phase 2
It was played in seven groups with four teams each, starting in October, 2012. The top two teams of each group and the best third-ranked team (when considering the matches against the first and second team) qualified.

Group 1

Group 2

Group 3

Group 4

Group 5

Group 6

Group 7

References

External links
Eurohandball Site 

Qualification
Europe Men's Championship qualification
Europe Men's Championship qualification
Qualification for handball competitions